Line 19 of the Hangzhou Metro is a rapid transit line in Hangzhou. The line was opened on 22 September 2022.

Description
There will be 17 stations on the line, including 13 underground stations and 4 elevated stations. The line will use 6-car Type A rolling stock.

It will connect Hangzhou West railway station, Alibaba headquarters, Hangzhou East railway station and Hangzhou Xiaoshan International Airport, and the termini will be Tiaoxi station and  station.

Opening timeline

Stations

See also
  Hangzhou Metro

Notes

References

Hangzhou Metro lines
Railway lines opened in 2022
2022 establishments in China
Transport infrastructure under construction in China
Standard gauge railways in China
Airport rail links in China